Jorunn Kvalø (born 15 July 1975) is a Norwegian former professional racing cyclist. She won the Norwegian National Road Race Championship in 1995.

References

External links

1975 births
Living people
Norwegian female cyclists
Place of birth missing (living people)